Terry is an extinct town in Pemiscot County, in the U.S. state of Missouri. The GNIS classifies it as a populated place.

The community's name is a corruption of the surname of Bill Terrett, an early settler.

References

Ghost towns in Missouri
Former populated places in Pemiscot County, Missouri